Plessite is a meteorite texture consisting of a fine-grained mixture of the minerals kamacite and taenite found in the octahedrite iron meteorites. It occurs in gaps (its name is derived from the Greek "plythos" meaning "filling") between the larger bands of kamacite and taenite which form Widmanstätten patterns.

Many types of plessite exist and vary in formation mechanism and morphology.  Some types of plessite as named by Buchwald's "Iron Meteorites" and Massalski's "Speculations about Plessite" are:
acicular or type I plessite
black or type II plessite
cellular or type III plessite
comb plessite
net plessite
pearlitic plessite
spheroidized plessite

See also
 Glossary of meteoritics

References 

Goldstein, J. I. Michael, J. R.,  2006, "The formation of plessite in meteoritic metal",  Meteoritics & Planetary Science Vol 41; No. 4, pages 553-570. Full text online.

Meteorite minerals
Meteorite mineralogy and petrology